Denys Sergiyovich Yurchenko (born 27 January 1978 in Donetsk) is a Ukrainian pole vaulter with three medals in Indoor Athletics Championships.

Career
At the 2000 Summer Olympics he suffered a mishap with a vaulting pole, injuring his groin and ending his season. He also initially won the bronze medal in the men's pole vault event at the 2008 Summer Olympics in Beijing.

On 17 November 2016, the IOC disqualified him from the 2008 Olympic Games, stripped his Olympic bronze medal and struck his results from the record for failing a drugs test in a re-analysis of his doping sample from 2008.

In May 2017, he was disqualified for two years.

His personal best jump (outdoor) is 5.83 metres, achieved in July 2008 in Kyiv.

Competition record

References

External links
 

1978 births
Living people
Competitors stripped of Summer Olympics medals
Ukrainian male pole vaulters
Athletes (track and field) at the 2000 Summer Olympics
Athletes (track and field) at the 2004 Summer Olympics
Athletes (track and field) at the 2008 Summer Olympics
Athletes (track and field) at the 2012 Summer Olympics
Olympic athletes of Ukraine
Sportspeople from Donetsk
Doping cases in athletics
Ukrainian sportspeople in doping cases